Rungroj Sawangsri is a retired professional footballer from Thailand.

He has played several times for the Thailand national football team, including a 2006 FIFA World Cup qualifying match.

Honours
International
 Sea Games 2001  Gold medal  Thailand U 23
 Sea Games 2003  Gold medal  Thailand U 23

Thai Premier League Winner x 2

2002/03 & 2003/04 - Krung Thai Bank FC (Bangkok Glass FC)

Thai Division 1 League Winner x 1

2013 - Air Force Central

Asian Champions League Appearances

References

1981 births
Living people
Rungroj Sawangsri
Rungroj Sawangsri
Rungroj Sawangsri
Rungroj Sawangsri
Rungroj Sawangsri
Southeast Asian Games medalists in football
Association football defenders
Competitors at the 2001 Southeast Asian Games
Competitors at the 2003 Southeast Asian Games
Rungroj Sawangsri